The Ślęża (or Zobtenberg, later also Siling) is a  high mountain in the Sudeten Foreland in Poland. The mountain is built mostly of granite and is covered with forests.

The top of the mountain has a PTTK tourist mountain hut, a television and radio mast, Church of the Visitation of the Blessed Virgin Mary, some poorly-visible ruins of the castle and an observation tower. The area of the peak is protected as the Góra Ślęża nature reserve. The wide area around the mountain forms the Ślęża Landscape Park protected area.

Location
Geomorphologically it is situated in the Ślęża Massif mesoregion of the Sudeten Foreland macroregion.

Sacred mountain
During the Neolithic Period and at least as far back as the 7th century BC Mount Ślęża (Zobten) was a holy place of the  tribes of the Lusatian culture. It was then settled by Slavs. 
The Silingi, a subpopulation of the East Germanic tribe known as the Vandals are the earliest inhabitants of Silesia known by their name, however the greater part of them moved westwards after the 5th century AD and the remainder were slowly replaced in the 6th century by Slavic tribes who assimilated the few remaining East Germanic inhabitants. The Silingi were part of the Przeworsk culture. 
The name of the territory Silesia either derives from the Ślęza River, or from Mount Ślęża, which themselves derive their name from either, according to Germanist authors the Silingi people. or, according to Slavisist authors, the Ślężanie people.

The Slavic Ślężanie tribe settled in the area around the 6th century AD. In the 10th century, Mieszko I incorporated Silesia into the Polish state. The etymology of the mountain is highly disputed between a Slavic, Germanic, or other Indo-European origin. The name has been recorded in several forms. As monte Silencii, in 1108, or as monte Slez in 1245.

Christianity came first via the Byzantine Church Slavonic missionaries saints Cyril and Methodius and by the diocese of Regensburg, then in the 10th century Bohemia received a bishopric, Prague, which was itself subject to the archbishopric of Mainz.

Mount Ślęża was an ancient holy place for local tribes dedicated to a sun deity, and remained a holy place during Christian times as well. In the first half of the 12th century, the owner of the place was the Polish dukes' governor, Piotr Włostowic, who founded there an Augustinian convent which was subsequently moved to Wrocław in 1153.

Etymology
The Silesians might have been named after the Silingi, as the Silingi were previous inhabitants of this region. Another explanation says that the word is perhaps derived from a Silesian word meaning "wet swampy place", the corresponding verb is "Ślęgnąć" meaning "to become wet".

Ślęża in art and culture
Mount Ślęża has been portrayed in the famous but atypical manner of Polish independent film Edi800 in the movie Ślęża Manekin Project III.

Transmitter

Gallery

See also
Geography of Poland

References

External links

 http://radiopolska.pl/wykaz/pokaz_lokalizacja.php?pid=165
 http://www.severfire.com/project/2015-09-20-gora-sleza/

Landforms of Lower Silesian Voivodeship
Mountains of Poland
Wrocław County